Route 215 is a  local highway in northwestern New Brunswick, Canada.

Communities
 Saint-François-de-Madawaska
 Lac-Unique
 Boundary

See also
List of New Brunswick provincial highways

References

New Brunswick provincial highways
Roads in Madawaska County, New Brunswick